The Neck is a settlement near Elliston, Newfoundland and Labrador.  It has long been a part of the town of Bonavista. In the 1945 census conducted by the British, (The) Neck was - along with other parts of Bonavista - such as Bayleys Cove and Mockbeggar - shown separately but in a reissue of this census put out by the Dominion Bureau of Statistics Bonavista was shown as one homogenous entity. Neck did occasionally report again but not since the late 1960s/early 1970s when it last recorded a separate figure of 82.

See also
List of communities in Newfoundland and Labrador

Populated coastal places in Canada
Populated places in Newfoundland and Labrador